Lawyer Magalu is a 1963 Indian Kannada-language film, directed and produced by G. V. Iyer. The film stars Kalyan Kumar, Udaykumar, B. Vijayalakshmi and T. N. Balakrishna in the lead roles. The film has musical score by G. K. Venkatesh.

Cast
Kalyan Kumar
Udaykumar
B. Vijayalakshmi
T. N. Balakrishna

References

External links
 

1963 films
1960s Kannada-language films
Films scored by G. K. Venkatesh
Films directed by G. V. Iyer